CJEF may refer to:

A former callsign of CJRP-FM
Combined Joint Expeditionary Force